State Road 103 in the U.S. State of Indiana is a  north–south route in Henry County.

Route description
State Road 103 nearly parallels its parent route, State Road 3, between U.S. Route 36 east of Mount Summit and U.S. Route 40 in Lewisville. It runs through downtown New Castle and past the Wilbur Wright Fish and Wildlife Area. It also crosses Interstate 70, but there is no interchange.

History 
SR 103 from US 40 to SR 38 was SR 3, before a new four-lane highway was built and SR 3 was rerouted onto the new four-lane highway.

Major intersections

References

External links

103